IC 2149 is a planetary nebula in the constellation of Auriga. It is a small, bright planetary nebula with something to offer in telescopes of most sizes.

Characteristics 
Visually it has an apparent magnitude of 10.6 and an apparent size of 12 arc seconds and like other objects of its class a nebular filter may help on its observation.

Its distance to the Solar System has been estimated to be around 1.1 kiloparsecs, having a total mass of 0.03 solar masses and being thought to have been produced by a low-mass star.

Some authors have proposed the planetary nebula that the Sun will produce will be similar to this one, but smaller.

The central star of the planetary nebula is an O-type star with a spectral type of O(H)4f.

References

External links
 

Planetary nebulae
2149
Auriga (constellation)